TPPA may refer to:
Trans-Pacific Partnership Agreement, a trade agreement
Treponema pallidum particle agglutination assay, a test for the causative agent of syphilis